A Department of Health and Mental Hygiene is an agency in some governments:
Maryland Department of Health and Mental Hygiene, the former name of the Maryland Department of Health from 1969 to 2017
New York City Department of Health and Mental Hygiene
New York State Department of Mental Hygiene